Jiucheng is a town of Luxi County in the northeastern reaches of the Honghe Hani and Yi Autonomous Prefecture in eastern Yunnan province, China, located (as the crow flies) around  northwest of the county seat,  north-northeast of Mengzi City and about  east-southeast of Kunming. , it has 11 villages under its administration.

References 

Township-level divisions of Honghe Hani and Yi Autonomous Prefecture